LBB may stand for:

 Lactobacillus delbrueckii subsp. bulgaricus, a bacterium used in the production of yogurt
 Ladyzhenskaya–Babuška–Brezzi condition, in mathematics
 Laura Bell Bundy, an actress and singer
 Little brown bird or little brown bats, name given to an unidentified species 
 Lubbock Preston Smith International Airport, by IATA code